Claudia Coslovich (born 26 April 1972 in Trieste) is a former Italian athlete who specialized in the javelin throw.

Her personal best was 65.30 metres, achieved in June 2000 in Ljubljana. She is a member of the Slovene ethnic minority of Friuli - Venezia Giulia.

She is engaged to the hammer thrower Nicola Vizzoni.

Achievements

National titles
She has won twenty individual national championship titles, an Italian all-time record for a woman.
13 wins in the javelin throw (11 consecutively from 1993 to 2003 and 2007, 2008)
7 wins in the javelin throw at the Italian Winter Throwing Championships (1995, 1998, 2000, 2001, 2002, 2004, 2007)

See also
 Italian records in athletics
 Italian all-time lists - Javelin throw

References

External links
 

1972 births
Living people
Sportspeople from Trieste
Italian female javelin throwers
Olympic athletes of Italy
Athletes (track and field) at the 2000 Summer Olympics
Athletes (track and field) at the 2004 Summer Olympics
World Athletics Championships athletes for Italy
Italian Slovenes
Italian people of Slovene descent
Mediterranean Games gold medalists for Italy
Mediterranean Games silver medalists for Italy
Athletes (track and field) at the 1997 Mediterranean Games
Athletes (track and field) at the 2001 Mediterranean Games
Mediterranean Games medalists in athletics
Italian Athletics Championships winners